Mechanical Man is a semi-official EP by new wave musicians Devo, released in 1978. It includes four 4-track basement demos by the band, recorded before they were signed to a record contract with Warner Bros. Records.

Background
The EP was a 7-inch single housed in a plain sleeve that came in a variety of colors including pink, blue, red, yellow and green.  Most EP sleeves were numbered on the back, although the exact number of EPs pressed is unknown. 

Opinions differ as to the legitimacy of the EP, with some sources considering it a bootleg. Devo webmaster and archivist Michael Pilmer states that it was produced by Virgin Records and included with some copies of the band's debut album Q: Are We Not Men? A: We Are Devo! in the United Kingdom.

Recording
The tracks "Mechanical Man" and "Auto-Modown" were recorded in 1975, when the band was a quartet and Jim Mothersbaugh was their drummer. "Blackout" was recorded in 1976, when Bob Casale had joined and Alan Myers had replaced Jim. The recording date for "Blockhead" is unknown, but the earliest known live performance of the song is from December of 1976.

Availability

Although the Mechanical Man EP has never had a proper CD release, all but one track ("Blockhead") were re-released on the compilations Hardcore Devo: Volume One and Volume Two. "Mechanical Man" is an edited version starting at 1:01 of the released version. "Clockout" is labelled as "Blackout" and "Auto-Modown" includes "Space Girl Blues".

Track listing
Side one
"Mechanical Man" (Mark Mothersbaugh) – 3:27
"Blockhead" (Bob Mothersbaugh, M. Mothersbaugh) – 3:08

Side two
"Blackout" (Gerald V. Casale) – 3:11
"Auto-Modown" (G.V. Casale) – 3:51

Personnel

Devo
Mark Mothersbaugh – keyboards; lead vocals (A1–A2)
Gerald V. Casale – bass guitar (A1–A2, B2), lead vocals (B1–B2)
Bob Mothersbaugh – lead guitar
Jim Mothersbaugh – electronic drums (A1, B2)
Bob Casale – bass guitar (B1), rhythm guitar (A2)
Alan Myers – drums (A2, B1)

Technical
Devo (as "Mechanical Man") – producers

External links
http://www.discogs.com/Devo-Mechanical-Man/master/97414

References

Devo EPs
1978 EPs